Yuliana Peniche Hernández Huici (born 29 August 1981) is a Mexican actress. She has participated in various soap operas; she started when she was a little girl in Madres Egoístas (1991) as Carmen. Then she starred in Alondra, María la del Barrio, Salomé, Niña Amada Mía, Velo de novia II, and in 2005 in the TV series Bajo el mismo techo sharing credits with Laura Flores, Imanol Landeta, and José Elías Moreno. In 2007 she starred in Destilando Amor as Margarita.

Telenovelas
 Un camino hacia el destino (2016) as Andrea
 Como dice el dicho (2013) as Laura
 Corazón indomable (2013) as Ofelia
 La fuerza del destino (2011) as Carmen
 Mar de amor (2009-2010) as Reyna
 Destilando amor (2007) as Margarita
 Bajo el mismo techo (2005) as Ximena Acosta 
 Velo de novia (2003) as Aniseta 'Anny' Paz 
 Niña Amada Mía (2003) as Luz 
 Salomé (2001-2002) as Money
 María la del Barrio (1995) as Alicia Montalban Smith 
 Alondra as Alondra

References

External links
 

1981 births
Living people
Actresses from Mexico City
20th-century Mexican actresses
21st-century Mexican actresses
Mexican child actresses
Mexican television actresses
Mexican telenovela actresses